Cultra (  - ) is an affluent residential neighbourhood near Holywood, County Down, Northern Ireland. It is part of Greater Belfast. It is in the Ards and North Down Borough Council area.

Cultra is home to the Royal North of Ireland Yacht Club, the club is home to Ross Kearney, the double Mirror Class world champion.

Places of interest
Ulster Folk and Transport Museum
Royal North of Ireland Yacht Club

People
Sir Arthur Kennedy (1809–1883), a British colonial administrator who served as governor of a number of British colonies, was born in Cultra.

Transport
Cultra railway station was opened on 1 May 1865. Trains run by Northern Ireland Railways on the Belfast-Bangor railway line serve the station.

References

Seaside resorts in Northern Ireland
Wards of Northern Ireland